John Divers (19 January 1874 – 13 March 1942) was a Scottish footballer who played as a forward for Hibernian, Celtic, Everton and Scotland.

He won the Scottish Cup on three occasions: with Celtic in 1899 and 1900 (having returned to the club for a second spell after a dispute over critical press reporters which led to his suspension and departure, along with Peter Meechan, in 1897), and with Hibs in 1902.

References

Sources

External links

1874 births
1942 deaths
Scottish footballers
Scotland international footballers
Association football forwards
Footballers from Glasgow
People from Calton
Scottish Junior Football Association players
Scottish Football League players
English Football League players
Hibernian F.C. players
Celtic F.C. players
Everton F.C. players
Benburb F.C. players
Vale of Clyde F.C. players
Scottish Football League representative players